Harriet Shing (born 17 October 1976) is an Australian politician. She is a Labor member of the Victorian Legislative Council, having represented the Eastern Victoria Region since 2014.

Shing is the first openly lesbian member of the Parliament of Victoria. She is also a member of the Labor Left faction of the Labor Party.

In June 2022, Shing was appointed minister for equality, regional development and water. This made her Victoria’s first cabinet minister with a Chinese background, and along with Steve Dimopoulos, became one of Victoria's first openly gay frontbenchers.

References

External links
 Parliamentary voting record of Harriet Shing at Victorian Parliament Tracker

Living people
Australian Labor Party members of the Parliament of Victoria
Labor Left politicians
Members of the Victorian Legislative Council
LGBT legislators in Australia
Lesbian politicians
21st-century Australian politicians
21st-century Australian women politicians
Women members of the Victorian Legislative Council
1976 births